Eston is both a surname and a given name. Notable people with the name include:

Surname:
John Eston (disambiguation), multiple people
Thomas Eston (fl.1413), English politician

Given name:
Eston Hemings (1808–1856), American slave
Eston Kohver (born 1971), Estonian police officer
Eston Mulenga (1967–1993), Zambian footballer